Eglinton was a provincial electoral district located in Toronto, Ontario. From 1926 until 1999 it elected members to the Legislative Assembly of Ontario. At its abolishment in 1999 it consisted of the neighbourhoods of Davisville and Lawrence Park in the north end of the old city of Toronto. It was abolished into Eglinton—Lawrence, Don Valley West and St. Paul's.

Members of Provincial Parliament

Election results

1926 boundaries

1934 boundaries

1966 boundaries

1974 boundaries

1987 boundaries

References

Notes

Citations

Former provincial electoral districts of Ontario
Provincial electoral districts of Toronto